Roodu is a village in Toila Parish, Ida-Viru County in northeastern Estonia.

Before the 2017 Administrative Reform, the village belonged to Kohtla Parish.

References

 

Villages in Ida-Viru County
Kreis Wierland